Demos may refer to:

Computing
 DEMOS, a Soviet Unix-like operating system
 DEMOS (ISP), the first internet service provider in the USSR
 Demos Commander, an Orthodox File Manager for Unix-like systems
 plural for Demo (computer programming)

Organizations
 Demos (UK think tank), London-based public policy research organisation and publisher
 Demos (U.S. think tank), a public policy research and advocacy organization
 DEMOS (Republika Srpska), a political party in Republika Srpska
 DEMOS (Montenegro), a parliamentary political party in Montenegro
 DEMOS (Slovenia), a coalition of democratic political parties in Slovenia
 Demos Medical Publishing, a publisher of books on medical subjects
 Solidary Democracy, a political party in Italy
 Democracy and Solidarity Party, a political party in Romania

Arts and entertainment
 Demos (film), a 1921 silent film
 Demos (novel), an 1886 novel by George Gissing
 Demos Journal, an Australian literary and political journal

Music
 Demos, 1982-86, a set of recordings by Swedish pop artist Per Gessle
 Demos (Crosby, Stills & Nash album), a 2009 album by Crosby, Stills & Nash
 Demos (Edith Frost album), 2004 album by Edith Frost
 Demos (Imperial Drag album), 2005 album by Imperial Drag
 Demos (Matt Skiba album), a 2010 album by Matt Skiba
 The Demos (Jess Moskaluke album), 2021 album by Jess Moskaluke
 The Demos (Rebecca Hollweg album)
 Demos, an EP by the Ramones which features four of the five demos recorded with Alan Betrock in the summer of 1975
 The Demos (Father John Misty EP)
 Cowboys from Hell: The Demos, by Pantera

People
 Demos Chiang (born 1976), Taiwanese businessman
 Demos Goumenos (born 1978), Cypriot football midfielder
 Demos Shakarian (1913–1993), Christian businessman of Armenian origin from Los Angeles
 George Demos (born 1976), former U.S. Securities and Exchange Commission prosecutor, and former congressional candidate

Other uses
 Demos, the ruling body of free citizens in ancient Greek city-states, such as Athens, a root of the word democracy
 Demos, the personification of the previous meaning, treated as a deity
 Demos, the Greek meaning as a rhetorical term in English
 Deme, (Greek: demos) a municipal subdivision of ancient Attica, Greece

See also
 The Demos Remastered: Anthology 1, a Black 'n Blue compilation album
 Unlabeled - The Demos, a 2006 EP by the American singer Leah Andreone
 Eindhovense Studentenvereniging Demos, a student association in the Netherlands
 Deimos (moon), one of the two moons of Mars
 Demo (disambiguation)
 Deimos (disambiguation)
 Demoz (disambiguation)
 Demonstration (disambiguation)